Anna Feore (born 23 November 1996) is a Canadian female volleyball player. She was part of the Canada women's national volleyball team and participated at the 2018 FIVB Volleyball Women's World Championship.

She played U Sports volleyball for the University of Toronto Varsity Blues for five seasons from 2014 to 2019 where she was a member of the 2016 national championship team.

References

External links 
 FIVB profile

Living people
1996 births
Canadian women's volleyball players
Liberos
Toronto Varsity Blues volleyball players